Malaysia Kalai Ulagam Award or acronym known as MUK Award is the Malaysian online award ceremony to pay tribute and award the key industry player within Malaysian Indian community who have been working hard to keep the local entertainment industry of Malaysia alive. This award were presented by online entertainment show, Malaysia Kalai Ulagam. The 2016 awards were held on 25 February.

Categories

Winners

2015:1st MKU Awards
 Most Popular Artiste: Denes Kumar
 Lifetime Achievement Award: K. S. Maniam

Movie category
 Best Movie: Vennira Iravuggal
 Best Actor: Aghonthiran (Kaithiyin Agarathi)
 Best Actress: Sangeeta Krishnasamy (Vennira Iravuggal)
 Best Male Supporting Actor: Thangamani (Vetti Pasanga)
 Best Female Supporting Actress: Malarvizhi Shanmugam (Vetti Pasanga)
 Best Male Newcomer: Rabbit Mac (Maindhan)
 Best Female Newcomer: Shaila Nair (Maindhan)
 Best Comedian: Gana (Victory)
 Best Lyrics writer: Yuwaji (Ore Oru Sollil – Vetti Pasanga)
 Best Music Director : Lawrence Soosai (Vennira Iravuggal)
 Best Director: R. Perakas (Vennira Iravuggal)
 Best Male Singer: Dhilip Varman (En Uyire – Vetti Pasanga)
 Best Female Singer: Renuka Shree (Ore Oru Sollil – Vetti Pasanga)
 Best Song: Azhagana Pani Katru (Victory)
 Best Cinematographer: Mano V.Narayanan (Vennira Iravuggal)
 Best Stunt Master: Ruben (Victory)
 Best Editor: Prem Nath (Maindhan)

Telemovie and DVD category
 Best Telemovie: Unarvu
 Best Actor: Haridhass (Unarvu)
 Best Actress: Sangeeta Krishnasamy (Unarvu)
 Best Male Supporting Actor: Suthagar (Otrumai Paalam)
 Best Female Supporting Actress: R. Kaameshaa (Unarvu)
 Best Music Director: Jamez Raj (Horoscopes)
 Best Director: S.Shashitharan (Unarvu)
 Best Cinematographer: Uthaya Kumar Palani (Unarvu)

Short Movie category
 Best Short Movie: Arinthum Ariyamalum
 Best Actor: Karnan G Crack (Netru Aval Irunthal)
 Best Actress: Aahmuu Thirunyanam (Aval Oru Pen)
 Best Male Supporting Actor: Mahessan Poobalan (Netru Aval Irunthal)
 Best Lyrics writer: Ooviya Ummapathi (Idhayam – Arai En 3010)
 Best Music Director: Jey Raghavendra (Nallathor Veenai Seithen)
 Best Director: Viknish Lokarag (Arinthum Ariyamalum & Netru Aval Irunthal)
 Best Song: Ithayam Vali Thanggave (Arai En 3010)
 Best Cinematographer: Ravyn Manogaran (Arinthum Ariyamalum)
 Best Video Song: Adiyeh Kirukki

Hosts
 Best Male TV Anchor: Denes Kumar (Astro)
 Best Female TV Anchor: Ahila (Vizhuthugal)
 Best Male Radio Host: Theyvekgan Thamaraichelven (Minnal FM)
 Best Female Radio Host: Revathy (THR Raaga)

References

Tamil cinema
Tamil diaspora in Malaysia
Malaysian film awards